The men's cross-country event in cycling at the 2004 Summer Olympics consisted of 1 start loop and 7 full loops around a circuit - totalling 43.3 km. The race started at 11:00 on 28 August 2004.

Medalists

Results

References

External links
Official Olympic Report

Men
Cycling at the Summer Olympics – Men's cross-country
Men's events at the 2004 Summer Olympics